The 1910 Iowa gubernatorial election was held on November 8, 1910. Incumbent Republican Beryl F. Carroll defeated Democratic nominee Claude R. Porter with 49.81% of the vote.

General election

Candidates
Major party candidates
Beryl F. Carroll, Republican
Claude R. Porter, Democratic 

Other candidates
A. MacEachron, Prohibition
John M. Work, Socialist

Results

References

1910
Iowa
Gubernatorial